Guochengyi is a town of Huining County, Gansu, China. It consists of 11 administrative villages and 59 natural villages.

Just west of the town are ruins of a Jin dynasty (1115–1234) town, known historically as Huizhou (会州), but known today as Guohama (郭虾蟆), named after general Guo Hama (:zh:郭虾蟆) Towards the end of the Long March in 1936, PLA troops were stations just north of the town for 50 days.

The town has significant watermelon farms.

References 

Township-level divisions of Gansu